Rugby Football Club Arsenal Tivat is a Montenegrin rugby club based in Tivat.

Honours

Domestic competitions 
 Montenegro Rugby Championship
Winners (1): 2013/14
 Montenegro Rugby Sevens Championship
Winners (2): 2013, 2014

Current squad
The provisional Arsenal Tivat Rugby Squad for the season is:

References

External links
 Tivat Arsenal Rugby Club on facebook.com

Montenegrin rugby union teams
Tivat